(I live, my heart, for your pleasure), 145, is a five-movement church cantata on a libretto by Picander which Johann Sebastian Bach, as its composer, probably first performed in Leipzig on Easter Tuesday, 19 April 1729. (after the incipit of the pasticcio's first movement).

 is one of less than a dozen extant cantatas and fragments of what is known as Bach's Picander cycle, or his fourth cantata cycle. According to the first publication of the cycle's librettos, this cycle ran from 24 June 1728 (Feast of John the Baptist) to the fourth Sunday after Trinity, 10 July 1729.

History and words 
No composer's autograph of the cantata is extant. The cantata is listed as Fp‑Inc 6 in the Bach Repertorium of Carl Philipp Emanuel Bach (BR-CPEB). According to the Bach Gesellschaft edition the cantata was composed for Easter.

Readings

For Easter Tuesday, the readings prescribed in Bach's Leipzig were from the Acts of the Apostles, the sermon of Paul in Antiochia, and from the Gospel of Luke, the appearance of Jesus to the Apostles in Jerusalem.

Picander's libretto for Easter Tuesday 19 April 1729
The Ich lebe, mein Herze, zu deinem Ergötzen libretto for a cantata for the Third Feast-day of Easter ("") was published in Picander's 1728–29 year-cycle of cantata librettos, which was first issued starting with a cantata for an occasion some three months after Easter. If first performed according to the plan of Picander's original publication of the cycle's librettos, BWV 145 premiered on 19 April 1729.

The closing chorale is the fourteenth and final stanza of Nikolaus Herman's Easter hymn "".

Preceding movements a and b
The five movements on Picander's text seem rather short for the purpose, therefore Alfred Dürr suggests that Bach might have added a sinfonia, as in two cantatas of the period, BWV 174 and 188, admitting that there is no source to substantiate it. Instead, in 19th-century manuscripts of the cantata, the five Picander movements are preceded by two movements:
 BWV 145/a: a four-part setting of the first stanza of Caspar Neumann's hymn "" (ca. 1700)
The two movements may have been added after Bach's death to make the cantata fit to be performed on Easter Sunday. Picander did not refer to the specific readings for the Third Day of Easter in his text. According to Klaus Hofmann, Carl Philipp Emanuel Bach expanded the cantata by the two additional movements in Hamburg (after 1768) and set the first movement himself. In 1787 Carl Philipp Emanuel Bach published the music of that movement as composed by his father (No. 337 in the Breitkopf edition of J. S. Bach's four-part chorales). According to Günther Zedler this sufficiently confirms that the movement was composed by the father. According to Christoph Wolff, the cantata may have been compiled by Carl Friedrich Zelter for the Sing-Akademie zu Berlin.

Scoring and structure 

The cantata is scored for three vocal soloists (soprano, tenor and bass), a four-part choir, trumpet, flauto traverso, two oboe d'amore, two violins, viola and basso continuo.

 Aria (tenor, soprano): 
 Recitative (tenor): 
 Aria (bass): 
 Recitative (soprano): 
 Chorale:

Music 
The first added movement is a four-part setting of the chorale stanza. The Telemann movement is in two parts, a duet and a choral fugue, with strings and instruments colla parte and a partly independent trumpet. In Telemann's cantata, it was preceded by an instrumental introduction on the same theme.

The first movement on Picander's text is a duet with obbligato violin. The tenor expresses the position of Jesus "" (I live, my heart, for your pleasure), whereas the soprano answers as the believer: "" (You live, my Jesus, for my pleasure). The movement resembles duets of Bach's secular cantatas and is possibly the parody of an unknown work. It is unusual that Bach has the tenor represent the voice of Jesus. The following secco recitative ends as an arioso to stress the words "" (My heart, take note!), a thought picked up in the following bass aria, the movement with the richest instrumentation, all instruments but the viola. It has the character of a dance in even periods and may also be a parody of a secular work. The cantata is closed by a four-part setting of the last stanza of the Easter hymn "".

Recordings 

 J. S. Bach: Das Kantatenwerk – Sacred Cantatas Vol. 6, Nikolaus Harnoncourt, Tölzer Knabenchor, Concentus Musicus Wien, soloist of the Tölzer Knabenchor, Kurt Equiluz, Thomas Hampson, Teldec 1983
 Die Bach Kantate Vol. 23, Helmuth Rilling, Gächinger Kantorei, Bach-Collegium Stuttgart, Costanza Cuccaro, Adalbert Kraus, Andreas Schmidt, Hänssler 1984
 Bach Edition Vol. 12 – Cantatas Vol. 6, Pieter Jan Leusink, Holland Boys Choir, Netherlands Bach Collegium, Ruth Holton, Nico van der Meel, Bas Ramselaar, Brilliant Classics 1999
 J. S. Bach: Cantatas for the 3rd Sunday of Epiphany, John Eliot Gardiner, Monteverdi Choir, English Baroque Soloists, Angharad Gruffydd Jones, James Gilchrist, Stephen Varcoe, Soli Deo Gloria 2000
 J. S. Bach: Complete Cantatas Vol. 12, Ton Koopman, Amsterdam Baroque Orchestra & Choir, Johannette Zomer, Christoph Prégardien, Klaus Mertens, Antoine Marchand 2000
 J. S. Bach: Cantatas Vol. 32 – BWV 111, 123, 124, 125, Masaaki Suzuki, Bach Collegium Japan, Hana Blažíková, Gerd Türk, Peter Kooy, BIS 2011

References

Sources 
 
 Ich lebe, mein Herze, zu deinem Ergötzen BWV 145; BC A 60; BR‑CPEB Fp‑Inc 6 / Sacred cantata Leipzig University
 Cantata BWV 145 Ich lebe, mein Herze, zu deinem Ergötzen history, scoring, sources for text and music, translations to various languages, discography, discussion, Bach Cantatas Website
 BWV 145 Ich lebe, mein Herze, zu deinem Ergötzen English translation, University of Vermont
 BWV 145 Ich lebe, mein Herze, zu deinem Ergötzen text, scoring, University of Alberta

Church cantatas by Johann Sebastian Bach
1729 compositions
Music for Easter